The 1968 Challenge Cup Final also remembered as the Watersplash Final was a rugby league match contested between Leeds and Wakefield Trinity on 11 May 1968 at Wembley Stadium in London. It was the 67th final of English rugby league's primary cup competition, the Challenge Cup. The match was played in virtually unplayable conditions due to the state of the waterlogged pitch caused by heavy downpours both before and during the game.

The final is best remembered for Wakefield's Don Fox missing a conversion from in front of the posts in the last minute of the game, handing Leeds an 11–10 victory. It was the club's eighth Challenge Cup win, and the first since 1957. Fox was the winner of the Lance Todd Trophy, as he had already been voted as man of the match before his miss.

Match details

References

External links
Pathe News coverage of the Rugby Cup Final 1968
Rugby Football League website

Challenge Cup finals
Challenge Cup Final
Challenge Cup Final
Challenge Cup Final
Challenge Cup Final
Leeds Rhinos matches
Wakefield Trinity